Whelp may refer to:

 Whelping, the birthing of carnivorous mammals
 any young, carnivorous mammal; most commonly a puppy
 Whelp (tidal bore) in an undular bore: the train of secondary waves behind the bore front
 HMS Whelp: the name of one ship of the Royal Navy and of another which was planned but cancelled